Hyles sammuti is a moth of the family Sphingidae. Kitching and Cadiou (2000) treat it as a valid species, while Pittaway treats it as a subspecies of Hyles tithymali, seeing the larvae are very similar to Hyles tithymali mauretanica. Based on studies of the mitochondrial DNA, Hyles sammuti probably hybridises with Hyles euphorbiae. It is known from Malta, but there are closely related populations found on Sicily and southern Italy, which might prove to be the same species.

The wingspan is 63–75 mm. There are multiple generations per year with adults on wing from February to October.

The larvae feed on Euphorbia spinosa, Euphorbia pinea and Euphorbia dendroides. The species overwinters as a pupa.

References

Hyles (moth)
Moths described in 1998